Hope Island is a 91-acre (0.368 km²) island located in Narragansett Bay in the State of Rhode Island. It is part of the Narragansett Bay National Estuarine Research Reserve, along with nearby Prudence Island and Patience Island, and home to colonial wading birds during their nesting season of spring and summer.

History
The island was a gift from Narraganset chief Miantonomi to Roger Williams, the founder of Rhode Island. The word "hope" is the Rhode Island motto and used on the Rhode Island State Seal with an anchor because Williams was inspired by the Biblical passage "hope is the anchor of the soul" in Hebrews 6:19.

The island was transferred to a Mr Rivers, who walked to the island in winter when the bay was frozen. One day he misjudged the ice thickness, fell in and later died. Hope Island was then (circa 1880s) sold to Hiram Aylsworth who kept the land until it was taken by the Navy as an ammunition depot for World War I. Aylsworth’s grandson, Aylsworth Brown having spent childhood summers on Hope Island, later purchased property in the Prudence Park area of Prudence where he aptly named his new home “Hopeview.”

There is an 18th-century farm site on the west side of Hope Island. To date, no archaeological work or documentary research has been carried out there. During World War II, the island was used by the U.S. Navy as an ammunition storage site. There are still ammunition bunkers and concrete roads remaining from this period.

Hope Island was acquired by the state in the early 1970s.

References 
 Narragansett Bay Reserve
 Narragansett Bay: A Friend's Perspective

Islands of Newport County, Rhode Island
Islands of Narragansett Bay
Nature reserves in Rhode Island
Protected areas of Newport County, Rhode Island
Islands of Rhode Island